William Frederick Mountford is a New Zealand rugby league footballer who represented New Zealand.

Playing career
Born in Blackball on the West Coast of the South Island, Mountford was one of ten children. Five of them, including Bill, went on to play for the South Island. This included Ken, who like Bill also represented New Zealand, and Cecil, who played for Wigan and later coached New Zealand.

Mountford played in one test match for New Zealand, in 1946 against the touring Great Britain Lions.

References

Year of birth missing
New Zealand rugby league players
New Zealand national rugby league team players
West Coast rugby league team players
South Island rugby league team players
Rugby league wingers
Rugby league centres
Blackball players
People from the West Coast, New Zealand